Edward Abraham Snyder (February 22, 1919 – March 10, 2011) was an American composer and songwriter. Snyder is credited with co-writing the English language lyrics and music for Frank Sinatra's 1966 hit, "Strangers in the Night".

Snyder was born in New York City on February 22, 1919. He studied piano at the Juilliard School before taking a job as a songwriter at the Brill Building.  Eddie Snyder died on March 10, 2011, in Lakeland, Florida, at the age of 92.

References

1919 births
2011 deaths
American composers
American male composers
American male songwriters
Golden Globe Award-winning musicians
Grammy Award winners
Juilliard School alumni
Musicians from New York City
Songwriters from New York (state)